Yislena Hernández (born 13 March 1990) is a Cuban rower. She competed in the women's lightweight double sculls event at the 2016 Summer Olympics.

References

External links
 

1990 births
Living people
Cuban female rowers
Olympic rowers of Cuba
Rowers at the 2016 Summer Olympics
Place of birth missing (living people)
Pan American Games medalists in rowing
Pan American Games silver medalists for Cuba
Rowers at the 2015 Pan American Games
Medalists at the 2015 Pan American Games
20th-century Cuban women
21st-century Cuban women